The Fothergill–Round–Mitchell Medal is a Victorian Football League (VFL) award that is presented to the most promising young talent in the VFL competition.

The medal has been awarded annually since 1989. It was originally named the Fothergill–Round Medal after Des Fothergill and Barry Round, who at the time were the only two players to have won both the J. J. Liston Trophy (or one of its predecessors) and the Brownlow Medal; it was renamed the Fothergill–Round–Mitchell Medal in 2018 to also recognise Sam Mitchell, the third player to achieve the feat.

Winners

References

Australian rules football awards
Victorian Football League